Vladimir Rodić (born 7 September 1993) is a Serbian football midfielder who plays for Östers IF. Between 2015 and 2016, he won five caps for the Montenegro national team.

Club career

FK Rad
In 2012, Rodić started his senior career with FK Rad in the Serbian SuperLiga. He enjoyed three loan spells at different clubs in Belgrade during the next two years, before establishing himself as a starter for the side.

Malmö FF
On 8 July 2015, Rodić transferred to Malmö FF in Allsvenskan, Sweden's first division, signing a three and half-year contract. He reportedly turned down a move to Atlético Madrid. He enjoyed a successful start at his new club, scoring against Red Bull Salzburg in the second qualifying round (3–2 on aggregate), as Malmö FF went through to the group stage of the 2015–16 UEFA Champions League.

Karabükspor
On 22 July 2016, Rodić moved to Karabükspor in the TFF First League, for an undisclosed fee, after being deemed surplus to requirements at Malmö FF. However, he had difficulties breaking in to the first-team at his new side, and was sent on loan to his former club FK Rad.

Randers FC
On 31 August 2017, Rodić signed a one-year deal with Randers FC in the Danish Superliga. He immediately made an impact at his new club, and signed a two-year contract extension on 15 November the same year. Rodić made 13 appearances and scored one goal, throughout the first half of the season as the club competed in the bottom half of the table, before leaving on 31 January 2018, the final day of the winter transfer window.

Silkeborgs IF
On 31 January 2018, Rodić moved to Silkeborg IF. He was awarded as the club's Player of the Month in both April and May, but was unable to save the club from a relegation from the Danish Superliga after losing to Esbjerg fB in the final round of the play-offs. In total, Rodić made 23 appearances for Silkeborg and scored seven goals.

Hammarby IF
On 7 August 2018, he transferred to Hammarby IF, thus returning for a second stint in the Swedish Allsvenskan. Rodić signed a three and a half-year deal with Hammarby, for a reported club record fee of around 5 million Swedish kronor (approximately £0,5 million). Linking up with compatriot Nikola Đurđić, his former teammate from Malmö and Randers, Rodić established himself as a starter as the club finished 4th in the 2018 Allsvenskan table, scoring three goals in 14 appearances.

After mainly being used as a substitute player throughout the first half of the 2019 season, Rodić came in to form in September by scoring six goals in just three games, most notably a brace against rivals AIK (in a 2–1 win) and a hat-trick against Örebro SK (in a 5–1 win). Rodić played 21 league games as the club finished 3rd in Allsvenskan after eight straight wins at the end of the season.

In 2020, Rodić made 17 league appearances for Hammarby, mostly as a substitute player. On 5 October the same year, he was sent on loan to Norwegian Eliteserien club Odds BK for the remainder of the year.

On 30 May 2021, Rodić won the 2020–21 Svenska Cupen, the main domestic cup, with Hammarby through a 5–4 win on penalties (0–0 after full-time) against BK Häcken in the final. Rodić made four appearances as the side reached the play-off round of the 2021–22 UEFA Europa Conference League, after eliminating Maribor (4–1 on aggregate) and FK Čukarički (6–4 on aggregate), where the club was knocked out by Basel on penalties (4–4 on aggregate). At the end of the year, it was announced that Rodić would leave the club at the expiration of his contract.

Östers IF
On 26 February 2022, Rodić signed a two-year contract with Östers IF in Superettan, Sweden's second tier.

International career
On 2 October 2015, he got a first call-up by Branko Brnović to the Montenegro national football team. He made his debut in a 2016 European Championship qualification match against Austria in Podgorica. He has won five caps in total, scoring no goals, and his final international was a March 2016 friendly match against Belarus.

Career statistics

As of 28 November 2021.

Honours
Malmö FF
 Allsvenskan: 2016

Hammarby IF
 Svenska Cupen: 2020–21

References

External links
 
 
 
 
 Vladimir Rodić at Utakmica.rs 
 Vladimir Rodic at Malmö FF 
 
 

1993 births
Living people
Footballers from Belgrade
Serbian people of Montenegrin descent
Association football defenders
Serbian footballers
Montenegrin footballers
Montenegro international footballers
FK Rad players
FK Palić players
FK BASK players
FK Srem Jakovo players
Malmö FF players
Kardemir Karabükspor footballers
Randers FC players
Silkeborg IF players
Hammarby Fotboll players
Odds BK players
Östers IF players
Serbian SuperLiga players
Allsvenskan players
Süper Lig players
Danish Superliga players
Danish 1st Division players
Eliteserien players
Montenegrin expatriate footballers
Expatriate footballers in Sweden
Montenegrin expatriate sportspeople in Sweden
Expatriate footballers in Turkey
Montenegrin expatriate sportspeople in Turkey
Expatriate men's footballers in Denmark
Montenegrin expatriate sportspeople in Denmark
Expatriate footballers in Norway
Montenegrin expatriate sportspeople in Norway